Geau Vada-Tau (born 3 May 1957) is a Papua New Guinean Lawn Bowler. Tau stunned the bowling world in 1990 when she won the gold medal in the singles at the Auckland Commonwealth Games without losing a game.
She became a national heroine because this was the first Commonwealth Games Gold Medal ever won by Papua New Guinean. Tau plays for the Boroko Club in Port Moresby.

References 

Living people
1957 births
People from the National Capital District (Papua New Guinea)
Bowls players at the 1990 Commonwealth Games
Commonwealth Games gold medallists for Papua New Guinea
Commonwealth Games medallists in lawn bowls
Papua New Guinean female bowls players
Medallists at the 1990 Commonwealth Games